Orrie Baragwanath Pass is situated in the Limpopo Province on the unnumbered road between Ofcolaco and Lebowakgomo (South Africa). The pass has a steep paved ascent from the east up the slopes of the far northern Drakensberg mountains to a height of 1370 m above sea level. From the west there is an equally steep but unpaved ascent with a fairly flat unpaved section of approximately 10 kilometers along the summit between the two approaches. Although most of the pass is located in the Lekgalameetse Provincial Park, it is nevertheless a public road with free access. Access fee is payable  if entering the pass from the Lekgalameetse entrance gate.

Mountain passes of Limpopo